Mia Wesley is an American television actress who has appeared on Grey's Anatomy, Desperate Housewives, Six Feet Under, ER, The Shield and many other shows.

Her first television appearance was a recurring role as Isabel on Party of Five in 1999.

External links
 

American television actresses
American film actresses
Living people
Year of birth missing (living people)
Place of birth missing (living people)
21st-century American women